The following is a list of the members as of the dissolution of the 37th Parliament of Canada on May 23, 2004, and reflects additions to the House resulting from by-election and resignations following the 2000 election.

Members
Party leaders are italicized.
Cabinet ministers are in boldface.
The Prime Minister is both.

Alberta

 Progressive Conservative leader until May 31, 2003.
 Canadian Alliance leader from March 20, 2002 to December 7, 2003. Conservative leader since March 20, 2004.

British Columbia

 Canadian Alliance leader until December 12, 2001.
 Canadian Alliance interim leader from December 12, 2001 to March 20, 2002.

Manitoba

New Brunswick

Newfoundland and Labrador

Nova Scotia

 NDP leader until January 25, 2003.
 Progressive Conservative leader from May 31, 2003 to December 8, 2003.

Ontario

Prince Edward Island

Quebec

 Liberal leader since November 14, 2003. Prime Minister since December 12, 2003.
 Liberal leader until November 14, 2003. Prime Minister until December 12, 2003.

Saskatchewan

The North

Changes since the 37th election

Former members of the 37th Parliament 

Previous members of the House of Commons in the 37th Parliament of Canada.

§ – formerly a member of the Bloc Québécois, sat as an independent from 16 January 2003 until retirement.

House Members Of The 37th Parliament Of Canada, List Of
37